Stannard is a surname. Notable people with the surname include:

 David Stannard, American historian
 Eliot Stannard (1888-1944), British screenwriter
 George J. Stannard, Union general in the American Civil War
 Ian Stannard, English cyclist
 Lynn Stannard, Manitoba judge
 Richard Stannard (songwriter), English songwriter and record producer
 Richard Stannard (triathlete), British triathlete
 Richard Been Stannard, English recipient of the Victoria Cross
 Russell Stannard, English physicist 
  a British family of painters
 Alfred Stannard
 Alfred George Stannard
 Eloise Harriet Stannard
 Emily Coppin Stannard
 Joseph Stannard

See also
 Ray Stannard Baker, American journalist and author
 Stannard Township, Michigan
 Stannard, Vermont
 Stannard Beach, a section of Westbrook, Connecticut
 Stannards, New York